Lee William Capra (born October 1, 1947), is an American former professional baseball pitcher, who played in Major League Baseball (MLB) for the New York Mets and Atlanta Braves, from  to .

Baseball career

Early years
Capra was a shortstop at Lane Technical College Prep High School in the Roscoe Village neighborhood on the Northside of Chicago. Besides playing shortstop, he began pitching at Illinois State University, and compiled a 17–5 record & 1.58 ERA. Capra was a team co-captain his senior year, and led the Redbirds to the  NCAA Division II Baseball Championship.

Capra was selected late in the 1969 Major League Baseball draft, by the New York Mets. Though primarily a pitcher, he played some shortstop and second base with the Pompano Beach Mets in 1969.

New York Mets
In , Capra made three appearances out of the bullpen, and did not allow an earned run in his first two big league appearances. However, he was not so lucky in his third appearance: Facing the St. Louis Cardinals at Shea Stadium, Capra entered the game in the tenth inning, and retired only one of the seven batters he faced, Jorge Roque, who bunted Joe Torre to second after Torre had led off the inning with a single), on his way to allowing five runs and taking his first major league loss.

Capra won his first major league start, over the San Diego Padres, on April 25, 1972; however, he found himself back in the minors by the All-Star break. Capra also split the  season between the Mets & the Triple-A Tidewater Tides. While all ten of his Tidewater appearances were starts, he was used exclusively in relief at the major league level. Capra earned his first major league save, on June 27, 1973, against the Philadelphia Phillies, pitching four innings of no-hit ball. Although he was on the Mets’ 1973 World Series roster, he did not appear in the 1973 National League Championship Series or World Series.

Atlanta Braves
During spring training in 1974, the Mets sold Capra's contract to the Atlanta Braves. His record as a reliever stood at 0–2, with one save (earned the evening Hank Aaron hit his record-breaking 715th home run, on April 8, 1974), and a 3.06 ERA, when he replaced an injured Ron Reed, in the first inning, on May 15, against the Padres. Capra pitched six innings of one-hit ball to earn the win — and Reed's spot in the starting rotation.

Over his next three games, Capra went 2–0, with a 1.00 ERA. He allowed just three walks, while striking out fifteen, and began a Braves-record streak of 26 innings pitched without allowing an earned run. Over the month of June, Capra went 6–0 with a 1.05 ERA, three shutouts, and another complete game, to set a team record with nine consecutive wins, on his way to earning NL Player of the Month honors, and selection to the NL All-Star team by his former manager with the Mets, Yogi Berra. (He did not make an appearance in the game.) 

During his winning streak Capra became a sensation in Atlanta. In a season in which the Braves averaged 12,112 attendance per home game, Capra's home starts in June and July averaged over 39,000. Capra cooled off during July and August (3-5, 4.43 ERA), but reverted to form in September, to end the season with a major league-best 2.28 ERA, 0.10 better than teammate, Phil Niekro (who finished second in the NL), and .21 better than American League (AL) leader, Catfish Hunter of the Oakland A's. He also held opposing batters to an NL-leading .208 batting average against (BAA).

Capra won his first two starts of the  season; however, a twinge in his pitching arm — that he had begun feeling toward the end of the previous season — worsened. Capra lost his next four starts, and was shut down for the season on June 8, with a 4–7 record and 4.25 ERA.

Capra did not return to the Braves until September 1, 1976, and was roughed up by the Chicago Cubs, in his first game back. He was relegated to mop-up duty over his next four appearances, and ended the season 0–1 with an 8.68 ERA.

Capra's first game of the  season also went poorly, but he pitched effectively enough in his next four appearances (3 earned runs in 11.1 innings, while holding opposing batters to a .179 batting average), to be placed in the starting rotation when an injury to Andy Messersmith opened a spot. He went 0–4 with an 8.55 ERA in four starts, before reverting to relief. Capra won his first game back in the bullpen, for his first win since he beat the Mets on May 25, 1975 (two days shy of two years earlier).

Messersmith suffered a second injury (on July 3), shutting him down for the season, and gave Capra a second shot at starting. He beat the Cincinnati Reds' "Big Red Machine," on July 13, then, on August 10, showed his old form against the Padres, allowing only two hits in nine innings, in an extra-inning game, where he was credited with a no-decision. Capra notched a win in the final game of his career, against the Houston Astros, September 26, 1977.

From the time Capra had re-entered the starting rotation, he had gone 2–4, with a 5.02 ERA, in sixteen starts over the remainder of the 1977 season. Overall, that season, Capra was 2–8, with a 5.84 ERA as a starter, and 4–3, with a 4.58 ERA in relief.

Coaching
The Braves released Capra at the end of spring training, and he retired as a player, shortly thereafter. He then returned to Illinois State as pitching coach for the Redbirds; Capra went on to become a pitching coach and manager, in the Mets’, Phillies’, and Braves' respective farm systems.

While attending Illinois State, Capra earned his degree in teaching, and taught ceramics at a Chicago high school during the off-seasons, while still a player. He is a member of the Illinois State Athletics Percy Family Hall of Fame.

Career stats

As a batter, Capra had only five runs batted in (RBI), in his playing career, the first coming on May 13, 1972, off Hall of Famer Juan Marichal, of the San Francisco Giants. That day, his second inning single drove in Cleon Jones, with the only run of the game. Capra's second RBI was also a game-winner, against the Los Angeles Dodgers, on June 24, 1974.

See also
List of Major League Baseball annual ERA leaders

References

External links

Buzz Capra at Ultimate Mets Database

1947 births
Living people
New York Mets players
Atlanta Braves players
National League All-Stars
National League ERA champions
Major League Baseball pitchers
Pompano Beach Mets players
Visalia Mets players
Memphis Blues players
Tidewater Tides players
Richmond Braves players
Baseball players from Chicago
Illinois State Redbirds baseball players